Reverso may refer to:

 Reverso (language tools), a website specializing in online translation aids and language services
 Reverso (climbing equipment), a belay device used in rock-climbing produced by Petzl
 Reverso (watch), a model of wristwatch produced by Jaeger-LeCoultre